Manteo may refer to:

 Manteo, 1st Baron of Roanoke and Dasamongueponke, sixteenth-century American Indian leader involved with the Roanoke Colony
 Manteo, North Carolina, United States
 Manteo, Virginia, United States
 Manteo High School, North Carolina
 Lochmaeus manteo, a North American moth
 Manteo Elementary School, North Carolina
 Manteo to Murphy, an expression that means "across North Carolina"
 Navy Auxiliary Air Station Manteo, now Dare County Regional Airport, North Carolina